Benjamin Peabody Gruber (born January 2, 1972) is an American television producer and screenwriter. He is known for his work on Superjail!, Breadwinners, Teen Titans Go!, and SpongeBob SquarePants.

Filmography

Television

References

External links 

1972 births
Living people
People from Pennsylvania
American male screenwriters
American television writers
American male television writers
American television producers
21st-century American male writers